Kretov is a Slavic masculine surname, its feminine counterpart is Kretova. Notable people with the surname include:

Anatoli Kretov (born 1976), Russian footballer
Kristina Kretova, Russian ballerina
Stepan Kretov (1919–1975), Soviet military aviator

Russian-language surnames